Cary is an unorganized township in Aroostook County, Maine, and part of the state's Unorganized Territory. As of the 2010 census, it had a population of 218.

History

Cary was settled in 1824. It was organized as Plantation Number 11, Range 1 on June 30, 1859; this organization was made official by the legislature on February 21, 1878. It was organized as Cary Plantation on January 27, 1883; this organization was made official by the legislature on March 5, 1895.

However, in March 2016, the Maine Legislature rejected the plantation's application, citing the financial burden  would add to the remaining municipalities in Aroostook County.

On October 3, 2017, residents again voted to deorganize, this time by a vote of 85 to 6, citing their rapidly increasing tax burden. The state legislature accepted their second deorganization proposal with an act that became law on April 21, 2018. On November 6, 2018, Cary residents voted to confirm the plantation's deorganization by a vote of 105 to 4. Cary became part of Maine's Unorganized Territory on July 1, 2019.

Geography

Demographics

As of the census of 2000, there were 217 people, 90 households, and 66 families residing in the township.  The population density was 11.4 people per square mile (4.4/km2).  There were 126 housing units at an average density of 6.6 per square mile (2.6/km2).  The racial makeup of the township was 96.77% White, 0.46% African American, 1.84% Native American and 0.92% Asian. Hispanic or Latino of any race were 1.38% of the population.

There were 90 households, out of which 25.6% had children under the age of 18 living with them, 66.7% were married couples living together, 3.3% had a female householder with no husband present, and 25.6% were non-families. 21.1% of all households were made up of individuals, and 11.1% had someone living alone who was 65 years of age or older.  The average household size was 2.41 and the average family size was 2.75.

In the township the population was spread out, with 19.8% under the age of 18, 8.3% from 18 to 24, 26.7% from 25 to 44, 30.0% from 45 to 64, and 15.2% who were 65 years of age or older.  The median age was 43 years. For every 100 females, there were 104.7 males.  For every 100 females age 18 and over, there were 107.1 males.

The median income for a household in the township was $29,500, and the median income for a family was $40,000. Males had a median income of $26,563 versus $19,375 for females. The per capita income for the township was $15,172.  About 9.1% of families and 14.1% of the population were below the poverty line, including 20.0% of those under the age of 18 and 17.5% of those 65 or over.

References

Populated places disestablished in 2019
Populated places in Aroostook County, Maine
Former towns in Maine